Ethmia zaguljaevi is a moth in the family Depressariidae. It is found Altai in the Russian Far East.

References

Moths described in 1980
zaguljaevi